Lycée Jean Mermoz may refer to:

Schools in France:
 in Montpellier
Lycée Jean Mermoz (Saint-Louis) in Saint-Louis, Haut-Rhin

Schools outside France:
Lycée Franco-Argentin Jean Mermoz
Lycée franco-chilien "Alliance Française" Jean-Mermoz, Curico, Chile
Jean-Mermoz International School (Ivory Coast)
Lycée Jean Mermoz (Senegal)